The 1977–78 Liga Gimel season saw 108 clubs competing in 8 regional divisions for promotion to Liga Bet.

Hapoel Afula, Maccabi Shefa-'Amr, Hapoel Ein Mahil, Maccabi Or Akiva, Hapoel Tira, Hapoel Azor, Maccabi Shikun HaMizrah and Maccabi Be'er Sheva won their regional divisions and promoted to Liga Bet.

Maccabi Acre, Hapoel Daliyat al-Karmel, Maccabi Bat Yam and Hapoel Bnei Lakhish were also promoted, as both Liga Leumit and Liga Artzit expanded from 14 to 16 clubs each.

Galilee Division

Bay Division

Haifa Division

Samaria Division

Sharon Division

Dan Division

Central Division

South Division

References
Memo no. 188 IFA 

Liga Gimel seasons
5